The Music Copyright Society of China (MCSC) (中国音乐著作权协会) is the country's only officially recognized organization for music copyright administration and has issued copyrights for over 14 million music works for approximately 8,000 members.

Founded in 1992, the Music Copyright Society of China is the only collective rights management organization for copyright in China, with ties to over 30 foreign music copyright protection organizations including the Irish Music Rights Organisation, the National Music Publishers' Association in the United States, and PRS for Music in England.

See also
Intellectual property in the People's Republic of China
Music copyright infringement in the People's Republic of China
China Audio-Video Copyright Association

References

External links
Official website

Music organizations based in China
Music licensing organizations
People's Republic of China intellectual property law
Organizations established in 1992